Paulinum may refer to:
Paulinum (hydrozoan), a genus of hydrozoans in the order Anthoathecata, family unassigned
Paulinum (University of Leipzig), university building of University of Leipzig
Paulinum Theological Seminary, Windhoek, Namibia